Zerehdar (also known as Zadeh Dar, Zardar, and Zereh) is a village in Tarrud Rural District, in the Central District of Damavand County, Tehran Province, Iran. At the 2006 census, its population was 134, in 36 families.

References 

Populated places in Damavand County